In digital photography, the Camera Image File Format (CIFF) file format is a raw image format designed by Canon, and also used as a container format to store metadata in APP0 of JPEG images. Its specification was released on February 12, 1997.

The CIFF standard consists of two parts, CIFF Specification on Image Data File (last revision: version 1.0 revision 4, dated 24 December 1997) and CIFF Specification on File/Directory organization and File Handling Protocol (last revision: version 1.0 revision 3, dated 9 February 1998). The format was developed and maintained by Canon with input from the CIFF Forum. The format is no longer used by Canon, having been superseded by the CR2 file format.

Digital cameras
The CRW format was supported by some earlier Canon digital cameras:

 Canon EOS D30
 Canon EOS D60
 Canon EOS 10D
 Canon EOS 300D
 Canon Powershot Pro1
 Canon Powershots G1-G6
 Canon Powershots S30-S70

Software that supports CRW
Besides Canon's ZoomBrowser and Digital Photo Professional, several other software programs provide read support, and sometimes write support, for CRW files including: 
 Adobe Photoshop
 Aperture
 darktable
 dcraw
 ExifTool 
 LibRaw
 Picasa
 RawTherapee

See also
 Raw image format
 Comparison of image viewers
 other digital negative formats

References

External links
 CIFF specification
 Canon CRW Specification
 The Canon RAW (CRW) File Format
 CR2 format
 Canon's CR2 Raw File Format Specification

Graphics file formats
Digital photography